Davy and the Goblin, or, What Followed Reading "Alice's Adventures in Wonderland"  is a novel by Charles E. Carryl that was serialized in St. Nicholas magazine from December 1884 to March 1885 before being published by Houghton Mifflin of Boston and Frederick Warne of London in 1885. It was one of the first "imitations" inspired by Lewis Carroll's two books, Alice's Adventures in Wonderland (1865) and Through the Looking-Glass (1871).

The story is about eight-year-old Davy who reads Lewis Carroll's classic novel Alice’s Adventures in Wonderland next to the fireplace, when he begins to get sleepy. A Goblin appears in the fire, munching coals, and takes Davy on a “believing voyage” where he meets a variety of characters from fantasy and literature.

The book features line drawings by Edmund Birckhead Bensell.

In 1891, Carryl wrote another book inspired by Alice's Adventures in Wonderland, called The Admiral's Caravan.

Bibliography
Carryl, Charles Edward (2011) Davy and the Goblin. Evertype.

Notes

External links
 Early edition in the Internet Archive
 

1885 fantasy novels
1880s children's books
American children's novels
American fantasy novels
Children's fantasy novels
Christmas novels
Books based on Alice in Wonderland
Works originally published in St. Nicholas Magazine
Novels first published in serial form
Houghton Mifflin books
Fictional goblins